Willem Johannes 'Lohan' Jacobs is a South African rugby union player, who most recently played with the . His usual position is scrum-half.

Career
At youth level, he represented  at various levels, all the way from U13 Craven Week level in 2004 to U21 Currie Cup level in 2012.

He got his first start in Blue Bulls colours in the Vodacom Cup game against  in 2012.

He played for the South Africa U20 team at the 2010 IRB Junior World Championship in Argentina.

References

South African rugby union players
Rugby union scrum-halves
Living people
1991 births
People from Krugersdorp
Blue Bulls players
South Africa Under-20 international rugby union players
Rugby union players from Gauteng